The 1994–95 Toronto Maple Leafs season was Toronto's 78th season in the National Hockey League (NHL).

Prior to the 1994–95 season, franchise player and fan favourite Wendel Clark was sent to the Quebec Nordiques in a blockbuster trade. Clark, along with defenceman Sylvain Lefebvre and Toronto's second pick in the 1993 NHL Entry Draft, Landon Wilson, were traded to the Nordiques on June 28, 1994, in exchange for forward Mats Sundin, defenceman Garth Butcher and Quebec's first pick in the 1992 NHL Entry Draft, Todd Warriner. In Clark's absence, the gritty and dependable veteran forward Doug Gilmour was named team captain.

After finishing fourth in 1992–93 and third in 1993–94, the Maple Leafs fell to fifth place in the Western Conference in 1994–95 and, for the first time in three seasons, they allowed more goals than they scored. Throughout the regular season, Toronto never won more than two games in a row, and finished just two games above .500. In addition, no Toronto player recorded a hat trick. To toughen up their lineup, the Leafs signed Warren Rychel from the Los Angeles Kings midway through the regular season, and on April 7, 1995, they traded center Mike Eastwood and a third-round pick in the 1995 NHL Entry Draft to the Winnipeg Jets in exchange for right wing Tie Domi.

Toronto was the only Western Conference team to score at least one goal in all 48 of its regular-season games in 1994–95 (the Quebec Nordiques and the Buffalo Sabres were the only Eastern Conference teams to accomplish this feat in 1994–95). The Maple Leafs finished sixth in the league in penalty-killing (84.86%) and allowed the most empty-net goals of any team in the league (8).

Offseason

Regular season
The Maple Leafs tied the Dallas Stars and the Hartford Whalers for the lowest shooting percentage during the regular season with just 135 goals on 1,520 shots (8.9%)

Season standings

Schedule and results

Playoffs
Although the Maple Leafs were the underdogs against the fourth-place Chicago Blackhawks in the opening round of the 1995 Stanley Cup playoffs, they won the first two games of the series at the United Center and went home to Maple Leaf Gardens for game three with two-games-to-none series lead. However, the Blackhawks played determinedly and won Games 3 and 4 in Toronto to regain home-ice advantage in the series. Chicago then won Game 5, 4–2, and looked to clinch the series in Game 6 back in Toronto. The Maple Leafs played a spirited game, going up 4–1 in the third period. The Blackhawks fought back with three consecutive goals to tie the game. At 10:00 of the first overtime period, Randy Wood scored his second goal of the game to give the Maple Leafs a 5–4 win. The victory tied the series at three games apiece and forced game seven back in Chicago. In Game 7, Joe Murphy scored twice and Ed Belfour made 22 saves as Chicago advanced to the second round for the first time in three years with a 5–2 win.

Player statistics

Regular season
Scoring

Goaltending

Playoffs
Scoring

Goaltending

Awards and records
 Kenny Jonsson, Defence, NHL All-Rookie Team
 Mats Sundin, Molson Cup (most game star selections for Toronto Maple Leafs)

Transactions
The Maple Leafs have been involved in the following transactions during the 1994–95 season.

Trades

Waivers

Free agents

Draft picks

Farm teams
 The Maple Leafs farm team was the St. John's Maple Leafs in St. John's, Newfoundland.

References
 Maple Leafs on Hockey Database

Toronto Maple Leafs seasons
Toronto Maple Leafs season, 1994-95
Toronto